Rosina Mamokgethi Phakeng  (née Mmutlana, born 1 November 1966) is a South African professor of mathematics education who in 2018 became a vice-chancellor of the University of Cape Town (UCT). She has been the vice principal of research and innovation, at the University of South Africa and acting executive dean of the College of Science, Engineering and Technology at UNISA. In 2018 she was an invited speaker at the International Congresses of Mathematicians. In February 2023 it was announced that she would leave her position as vice-chancellor of UCT and take early retirement. She was succeedded by Professor Daya Reddy on 13th of March 2023

Early life
Phakeng was born in Eastwood, Pretoria, to Frank and Wendy Mmutlana (née Thipe). Her mother went back to school after having her three children to complete Form 3 as entry to gaining a Primary Teachers Certificate to practice as a teacher. Her father was one of the first black radio announcers at the South African Broadcasting Corporation (SABC).

Phakeng started school in 1972 at Ikageleng Primary in Marapyane village and then Ikageng Primary in Ga-Rankuwa. She attended Tsela-tshweu higher primary; Tswelelang Higher Primary; Thuto-Thebe Middle School; Odi High School and Hebron. She completed her matric with University Exemption in 1983 (Grade 12) in the village of Hebron's College of Education.

Higher education
Phakeng achieved a Bachelor of education in mathematics education at the University of North-West, and a M.ed in mathematics education at the University of the Witwatersrand, and in 2002 became the first black female South African to obtain a PhD in mathematics education. In September 2022, Phakeng won the first Africa Education Medal for her commitment to promoting education in Africa, particularly for her research on language practices in multilingual mathematics classrooms.

Career accomplishments 
Phakeng has won awards for excellence in service. These honors include:
Doctor of Science, honoris causa, University of Bristol
 The Order of the Baobab (Silver) for her excellent contribution in the field of science and representing South Africa on the international stage through her outstanding research work presented to her by former president of South Africa Jacob Zuma. (April 2016)
CEO Magazine award for being the most influential woman in education and training in South Africa (August 2013):
 NSTF award for being the most outstanding Senior Black Female Researcher over the last 5 to 10 years in recognition of her innovative, quality research on teaching and learning mathematics in multilingual classrooms. (May 2011)
 Golden key International Society Honorary life membership (May 2009)
 Association of Mathematics Education of South Africa (AMESA) Honorary life membership (July 2009)
 Amstel Salute to Success finalist (2005)
 Dr. T. W. Khambule Research Award for being the most outstanding young female black researcher for 2003: Conferred by the NSTF (May 2004)
 Outstanding Service Award (Education category). Conferred by the Sunday Sun and Christ Centred Church (2004).
 Finalist for SA Woman of the Year in the Science and Technology Category (2003).
 Prestige National Award South Africa's Inspirational Women Achievers Award -Conferred by RCP Media, (June 2003).
 NRF Thuthuka Award (2003–2008).
 National Research Foundation/National Science Foundation USA/SA fellowship (2001; 2003)
 Mellon Award (1998 – 2000)
 SAB Women in Rural Areas Award (1997).

Positions held 
 Vice-Chancellor of the University of Cape Town (2018 - 2023)
 Deputy Vice-Chancellor of the University of Cape Town (2016)
 Vice-Principal of Research and Innovation at the University of South Africa
 Executive Dean of College of Science Engineering and Technology of University of South Africa
 Honorary Professor of University of the Witwatersrand
 Professor extraordinaire of Tshwane University of Technology
 Deputy Chairperson of National Committee for the International Mathematics Union
 Trustee of FirstRand Foundation
 Trustee of Telkom SA Foundation
 Board Member of South Africa, International Council for Science (ICSU) Board
 Managing Director of Pythagoras
 Bristol Illustrious Visiting Professor

Personal life
Phakeng was married to Richard Setati for 19 years (1988–2007) and they had one son, Tsholofelo who was born in 1990. In 2012, she married Madimetja Lucky Phakeng, thereby adding the appendage "Phakeng" to her surname. Lucky Phakeng is an advocate currently heading the Takeover Regulation Panel.

Controversy 
Shortly after being appointed to the position as vice-chancellor of UCT allegations questioning Phakeng's academic credentials emerged which were refuted as being part of a smear campaign against her. 

On 22 February 2023 it was reported by News24 that Phakeng would take early retirement from her position as vice-chancellor of UCT following the appointment of an independent panel to investigate allegations of mismanagement and abuse of power.

Twitter 
During her time at UCT a number of controversial social media statements have been made via Phakeng's Twitter account. 

In 2018 Phakeng controversially congratulated a UCT student on social media who notably ended their undergraduate paper with the racially divisive slogan "One Settler, One Bullet." Phakeng later stated she regretted the divisive incident, did not see the statement before making the congratulatory statement, would never support calls for violence, and was instead trying to congratulate a student on a significant personal academic milestone.

Managerial style 
Phakeng's tenure as vice-chancellor of UCT has been controversial with accusations by university academics and the university's ombud that she allowed for the emergence of a culture of fear, secrecy, racialisation, unfair treatment and bullying within the university that has resulted in the departure of numerous academics. The ombud and the university's former deputy council chair have accused Phakeng of covering up accusations and findings against her whilst the university's former deputy vice-chancellor for teaching and learning has accused her of having deliberately misled university's Senate. In a Senate vote on the matter Phakeng controversially cast a deciding vote against an independent investigation into her own conduct, thereby possibly breaching university conflict of interest rules. Phakeng's supporters, including the Economic Freedom Fighters, allege that she has been targeted by groups resistant to racial transformation of the university. UCT stated that the accusations against Phakeng contained within a 2022 Daily Maverick article on the matter were "incorrect, misleading and unethical"; the Daily Maverick disputed UCT's criticisms of their article.

References

External links
 

Academic staff of the University of South Africa
Fellows of the African Academy of Sciences
Living people
1966 births
Vice-Chancellors of the University of Cape Town
North-West University alumni
University of the Witwatersrand alumni
Women heads of universities and colleges